The Bateman-Griffith House is a historic house at 316 Jefferson Street in Clarendon, Arkansas, United States.  It is a brick and stone two-story structure, with a steeply pitched gable roof, with a long single-story section projecting to one side, and a stone-arch porte cochere on the other.  Built in 1930, it is a locally distinctive example of Tudor Revival architecture, designed by Memphis, Tennessee architect Estes Mann of the firm Mann & Gatling.

The house was listed on the National Register of Historic Places in 1984.

See also
National Register of Historic Places listings in Monroe County, Arkansas

References

Houses on the National Register of Historic Places in Arkansas
Houses completed in 1930
Houses in Monroe County, Arkansas
National Register of Historic Places in Monroe County, Arkansas